Usinger is a surname.

Notable people with the name Usinger include:

 Christian Usinger (1894–1949), German military officer 
 Fritz Usinger (1895–1982), German writer
 Robert L. Usinger (1912–1968), American entomologist
 Rudolf Usinger (1835–1874), German historian

See also
Usinger's, a sausage-making company

German-language surnames